The following is a list of releases by independent record label Deathwish Inc. The label was founded by Jacob Bannon of Converge and Tre McCarthy in 2000 and began releasing albums in 2001. This list does not include releases by the sub-labels Icarus, Secret Voice or Malfunction Records, or Deathwish's sampler album series.


Main discography

Sub-discographies

Limited edition album catalog

Digital live album catalog

Footnotes
A. Two changes were made to the catalog numbers to help the table's sorting feature function in its intended fashion. First, Deathwish's catalog numbers were previously preceded by the letters "DWI", but newer releases are only preceded by "DW". All releases listed here are preceded by "DW" for uniformity. Secondly, additional zeros were added to single- and double-digit catalog numbers also with the intent of assisting the table's sorting feature.

References
General

Specific

External links
Deathwish Inc. discography links
 Deathwish Inc. discography at Discogs
 Deathwish Inc. discography at Rate Your Music

Deathwish-related discographies links
 Malfunction Records discography at Discogs
 Malfunction Records discography at Rate Your Music
 Icarus Records discography at Discogs
 Secret Voice discography at Discogs
 Secret Voice discography at Rate Your Music

 
Discographies of American record labels